Ana María Orozco Aristizábal (born July 4, 1973) is a Colombian movie, theatre and television actress who is notable for her portrayal as Betty in the telenovela Yo soy Betty, la fea. In 2001, Orozco won the award for International Female Personality of the Year (Figura internacional femenina del año) at the New York Latin ACE Awards and in 2002, won the award for Actress of the Year (Actriz del año) at the INTE Award for her performance in the telenovela Yo soy Betty, la fea (1999).

Personal life
Born in Bogotá, Colombia. Orozco is the daughter of actor Luis Fernando Orozco and radio announcer Carmenza Aristizábal. She is also the older sister of actress Verónica Orozco (b. 1979) and Juliana. In April 1999, Orozco married actor Julian Arango, but the marriage lasted only 10 months. Since 2004, she has lived in Bogotá, Colombia. From 2005 to 2012, she was married to Argentine musician Martín Quaglia. Quaglia and Orozco have two daughters, Lucrecia (b. 11 June 2004 in Bogotá, Colombia) and Mia (b. October, 2009 in Buenos Aires, Argentina).

Career
Ana María Orozco made her television debut as a child alongside her father, Luis Fernando Orozco in La envidia (1973), but her career began in earnest a decade later with the series Pequeños Gigantes (1983). One of her most memorable performances was as a secretary (Verônica Murillo) in Perro Amor (1998). She is best known to fans around the world as the original Betty from the popular Colombian telenovela Yo soy Betty, la fea (I am Betty, the ugly) and its spinoff Eco moda. Her role on Betty La Fea and the character's unattractive/ugly duckling trademark has inspired several international versions, including the Mexican serial La fea más bella and the critically acclaimed American smash hit Ugly Betty. According to The New York Times, the original version itself become one of the world's most popular television shows.

Filmography

Television

Telenovelas

Series / Miniseries

Movies

Theater

Awards and nominations

References

External links
  
 
 

1973 births
Colombian people of Basque descent
Colombian people of Spanish descent
Living people
Colombian film actresses
Colombian telenovela actresses
Colombian television actresses
Actresses from Bogotá
20th-century Colombian actresses
21st-century Colombian actresses
Colombian artists
People from Bogotá
Naturalized citizens of Argentina